Ennahar newspaper is an independent Algerian daily newspaper published by El-Atheer Press Company in Hydra, Algeria, issued in 2007.

History 
This newspaper is considered the first independent daily newspaper in Algeria to be issued by journalists who have not worked in the government press before and are not affiliated with any political party.

See also 
 List of newspapers in Algeria

References 

2007 establishments in Algeria
Newspapers published in Algeria
Arabic-language newspapers
Publications established in 2007
Mass media in Algiers